Vasudevan Gnana Gandhi is an Indian rocket scientist, known as the pioneer of cryogenic rocket science in India. A graduate in Mechanical Engineering from the Thiagarajar College of Engineering, Madurai, Gandhi started his career by joining the Indian Space Research Organization in 1968 and held many positions such as Project Director and Programme Director at ISRO. His contributions are reported behind the development of booster liquid stages of Geosynchronous Satellite Launch Vehicle and the uprating of VIKAS engine. A recipient of the Aeronautical Society of India Award, Gandhi was honored by the Government of India, in 2005, with the fourth highest Indian civilian award of Padma Shri. Currently, Vasudevan Gnana Gandhi is working as Senior Vice President-Propulsion at Skyroot Aerospace, Hyderabad and also as chief academic advisor to Givemefive.ai.

See also

 Cryogenic rocket engine
 Geosynchronous Satellite Launch Vehicle

References

Living people
Recipients of the Padma Shri in science & engineering
Scientists from Tamil Nadu
Indian Space Research Organisation people
Year of birth missing (living people)